The Ring is a 1952 American film noir film directed by Kurt Neumann and based on a novel by Irving Shulman. It tells the story of a Mexican-American male who becomes a boxer, believing this kind of achievement will gain him respect among the English-speaking white majority. The film was shot in various locations in early 1950s Los Angeles. The film examines institutionalized bigotry.

Plot 
The film focuses on a young Mexican-American named Tomas Cantanios, who boxed under the pseudonym Tommy Kansas, a resident of Los Angeles's poor Chicano neighborhood. He feels constrained due to his inability to thrive in a white-dominated society. Therefore, to achieve popularity, he becomes a professional boxer, achieving fame and recognition. He soon discovers that Anglos are only drawn to him for his sports reputation and that they still consider him an outsider because of his ancestry and skin color. In fact, the only two white men who treat him decently are his manager Pete and trainer Freddy. However, their tolerant behavior is based primarily on monetary gain. Tommy also is conflicted by his unconditional love for Lucy, the daughter of a punch-drunk bum.

Production 
The Ring is one of the early sports-centered films in Hollywood in which discrimination against Chicanos is presented. Its Mexicano/sports themes can be traced to the 1940s with films like The Girl from Monterrey.

Cast 

 Lalo Rios - Tommy
 Gerald Mohr - Pete
 Rita Moreno - Lucy
 Robert Arthur - Billy Smith
 Robert Osterloh - Freddy
 Jack Elam - Harry Jackson
 Martin Garralaga - Vidal
 Peter Brocco - Barney Williams
 Julia Montoya - Rosa
 Lillian Molieri - Helen
 Pepe Hern - Rick
 Victor Millan - Pablo
 Tony Martinez - Go-Go
 Art Aragon - himself
 Robert Shayne - Jimmy, Aragon's manager 
 Ernie Chavez - Joe  
 Edward Sieg - Benny  
 Robert Altuna - Pepe Cantanios

References

External links 
 

Film noir
Films directed by Kurt Neumann
Films based on American novels
Films scored by Herschel Burke Gilbert
1950s sports drama films
American boxing films
American sports drama films
1952 drama films
1952 films
American black-and-white films
1950s English-language films
1950s American films